John Austin Sands Monks (1850–1917) was an American painter and etcher known especially for his paintings of sheep. Born in Cold Spring, New York, to John and Sarah Catherine Monks, he was educated at the Hudson River Institute and studied engraving under George N. Cass and painting under George Inness. He was a longtime resident of Medfield, Massachusetts, and had a studio in Boston. He was a member of the Boston Art Club, the Copley Society, the Salmagundi Club, and the New York Etching Club. His sister was the naturalist Sarah P. Monks. He died in Chicago while visiting his daughter at the age of 66.

References

External links

John A. S. Monks papers, 1890-1940 at the Archives of American Art

1850 births
1917 deaths
People from Cold Spring, New York
People from Medfield, Massachusetts
19th-century American painters
19th-century male artists
Painters from Massachusetts
Animal painters
Artists from Boston